Macun Port is a seaport in Hainan, China.

References

External links

Ports and harbours of Hainan